Namaste is a greeting originating from India and Nepal.

Namaste may also refer to:
"Namaste" (Better Call Saul), an episode from the television series Better Call Saul
"Namaste" (Lost), an episode from the television series Lost 
 Salaam Namaste, a 2005 Indian Bollywood film
"Namasté", a Beastie Boys track from the album Check Your Head
"Namaste", a Veil of Maya track from the album [id]
 Namaste Retreat Center, former retreat center that shared grounds with the Living Enrichment Center

See also
Namastey London, a 2007 Indian film
Bistra, Alba, for the Romanian village of Nămaş